Beştalı or Beshtali may refer to:
Beştalı, Neftchala, Azerbaijan
Beştalı, Salyan, Azerbaijan